"Then Leave" is a song by American rapper and producer BeatKing featuring fellow rapper Queendome Come, released as a single on March 25, 2020, from BeatKing's album Gangsta Stripper Music 4 (2020). In June 2020, the song went viral on video-sharing app TikTok.

Background
"Then Leave" garnered popularity after various choreographed dances were posted on TikTok, based on the user Boujee.Tay's moves. As of July 2020, the song's audio was used in over 151,000 videos. In the midst of the song's growing popularity, Columbia Records removed the song's parent album from streaming services. BeatKing announced, however, a new version of the album would be released "soon".

Chart performance
On the US Rolling Stone Top 100, for the week ending July 2, 2020, the song debuted at number 88, with over four million streams. The song also debuted at number 3 on the Bubbling Under Hot 100.

Music video 
The song's official video was released on March 27, 2020, directed by OG Visions. The video's description simply reads "Ratchet Ass Shit".

Charts

Certifications

References 

2020 songs
2020 singles
Columbia Records singles